Howard Evan Runner (January 28, 1916 in Oxford, Pennsylvania – March 14, 2002) was professor of philosophy at Calvin College, Grand Rapids, Michigan, from 1951 until his retirement in 1981.

He was a graduate of Wheaton College in Wheaton, Illinois, Westminster Theological Seminary in Philadelphia, Pennsylvania, (where he was deeply influenced by the  thought of Professor Cornelius Van Til), and The Free University of Amsterdam, Netherlands.  It was at the Free University that he was taught by Herman Dooyeweerd and D. H. Th. Vollenhoven, whose ideas relating to the construction of a whole new way of doing philosophy Christianly from a biblical basis radically changed the direction of his life, and whose teachings he later brought to North America. Runner's dissertation applied D. H. Th. Vollenhoven's problem-historical method to Aristotle's Physics.  Runner had also studied at Harvard University, where he was a Junior Fellow of the Society of Fellows, and at the University of Pennsylvania, where he engaged in intensive studies in Greek and philosophy.

Early in his career at Calvin College he organized the Groen van Prinsterer Society (known popularly as the 'Groen Club'), which brought him together with students specifically interested in discussing issues relating Christianity to culture, and the necessity Runner saw of Christian cultural organization.  He was also greatly influential in the setting up of the Association for Reformed Scientific Studies (ARSS) in 1956 – which later became the Association for the Advancement of Christian Scholarship (AACS).  The AACS eventually became the Institute for Christian Studies (ICS).  The ICS's first senior members were all students of Runner. His influence extended to the UK, through the work of Elaine Storkey and Richard Russell who had studied with him in Canada, and through David and Ruth Hanson, who set up the West Yorkshire School of Christian Studies.

Currently, both Redeemer University College (RUC) and the ICS have chairs in Runner's honor.  RUC has the H. Evan Runner Chair in Philosophy, currently held by Craig Bartholomew, while the ICS has the H. Evan Runner Chair in the History of Philosophy, currently held by Robert Sweetman.

Works 
The Relation of the Bible to Learning Reprint: Toronto: Wedge, 1974.
Scriptural Religion and Political Task Reprint:  Toronto: Wedge, 1974.
'ARSS and its reorganization' Calvinist Contact 1962: 5-7
'Dooyeweerd's Passing: An Appreciation' The Banner April 22, 1977: 20-23.
'Interview with Dr. H. Evan Runner' by Harry Van Dyke and Albert M. Wolters in Hearing and Doing pp. 333–361
Vollenhoven's History of the Presocratic Philosophers 
Verbonds-geschiedenis (Promise and Deliverance) by S.G. De Graaf;  Translated by H. Evan Runner and his wife Ellen.

Festschrifts 
Bernard Zylstra, "Preface to Runner," In The Relation of the Bible to Learning (Paideia Press, 1982, 5th edn) extract 
John Kraay & Anthony Tol (eds), Hearing and Doing: Philosophical Essays dedicated to H. Evan Runner (Wedge, 1979)
Life Is Religion: Essays in Honor of H. Evan Runner (Paideia Press, 1981)

References

External links 
Al Wolters  The importance of H. Evan Runner 
Theodore Plantinga H. Evan Runner: Man of Passion, Man of Conviction
 H. Evan Runner Blog Lecture notes etc.

1916 births
2002 deaths
Harvard University alumni
Westminster Theological Seminary alumni
Calvin University faculty
Calvinist and Reformed philosophers
Wheaton College (Illinois) alumni